Birch syrup is a savory, mineral-tasting syrup made from birch sap, and produced in much the same way as maple syrup. However, it is seldom used for pancake or waffle syrup; more often it is used as an ingredient paired with pork or salmon dishes in sauces, glazes, and dressings, and as a flavoring in ice cream, beer, wine, and soft drinks. 

It is condensed from the sap, which has about 0.5–2% percent sugar content, depending on the species of birch, location, weather, and season. The finished syrup is 66% sugar or more to be classified as a syrup. Birch sap sugar is about 42–54% fructose and 45% glucose, with a small amount of sucrose and trace amounts of galactose. 

The main sugar in maple syrup is the more complex sucrose, and the chemical contents of maple syrup are also different, leading to a flavor difference. 

The flavor of birch syrup has a distinctive and mineral-rich, caramel-like taste with a hint of spiciness that is not unlike molasses, balsamic condiment, or some types of soy. Different types of birch will produce slightly different flavour profiles; some more copper, others with hints of wildflower honey. While birch syrup has the same sugar content of maple, it is darker, stronger, and more complex.

Method

Making birch syrup is more difficult than making maple syrup, requiring about 100–150 liters of sap to produce one liter of syrup—more than twice the sap needed for maple syrup. 

The tapping window for birch is generally shorter than for maple, primarily because birches live in more northerly climates. It also happens later in the year than maple tapping. The trees are tapped and their sap collected in the spring (generally mid- to late April, about two to three weeks before the leaves appear on the trees). 

The common belief is that while birches have a lower trunk and root pressure than maples, pipeline or tubing method of sap collection used in large maple sugaring operations is not as useful in birch sap collection. However Rocky Lake Birchworks in The Pas, Manitoba is successfully using the tubing method along with a vacuum system for collection of birch sap. 

The sap is reduced in the same way as maple sap, using reverse osmosis machines and evaporators in commercial production. While maple sap may be boiled down without the use of reverse osmosis, birch syrup is difficult to produce this way: the sap is more temperature sensitive than is maple sap because fructose burns at a lower temperature than sucrose, the primary sugar in maple sap. This means that boiling birch sap to produce syrup can much more easily result in a scorched taste.

Production
Most birch syrup is produced in Russia, Alaska and Canada from paper birch or Alaska birch sap (Betula papyrifera var. humilis and B. neoalaskana). These trees are found primarily in interior and south central Alaska. The Kenai birch (Betula papyrifera var. kenaica), which is also used, grows most abundantly on the Kenai Peninsula, but is also found in the south central part of the state and hybridizes with B. humilis. The southeast Alaska variety is the Western paper birch (Betula papyrifera var. commutata), and has a lower sugar content. One litre of syrup from these trees requires evaporation of approximately 130–150 litres of sap.

Total production of birch syrup in Alaska is approximately 3,800 liters (1,000 U.S. gallons) per year, with smaller quantities made in other U.S. states and Canada (also from paper birch), Russia, Belarus, Ukraine, and Scandinavia (from other species of birch). Because of the higher sap-to-syrup ratio and difficulties in production, birch syrup is more expensive than maple syrup, up to five times the price.

See also
 Birch beer
 Birch sap
 List of syrups
 Xylitol, a sugar alcohol extracted from birch

References

External links

 Petition to US Food and Drug Administration for establishment of Standard of Identity for birch syrup, including the Alaska Birch Syrupmakers' Association Best Practices. July 18, 2005.
 Birch Boy Gourmet Syrups' educational articles on birch and other syrups
 Crooked Chimney Syrups research page research on sugar content of birch sap
 "Birch: white gold in the boreal forest" (PDF) 2004. Deirdre Helfferich. Agroborealis 35:2, pp. 4–12.
 CBC story on Rocky Lake Birchworks April 2018
 Article on birch syrup in Edible Toronto magazine

 Listening
 "Alaska Sap Suckers" (A story from National Public Radio's All Things Considered program, May 29, 2001)
 "Not Just Maple Syrup: Birch, Beech and Other Sappy Trees" (Living on Earth, week of March 26, 2021)

Non-timber forest products
Syrup